Appleton Tower is a tower block in Edinburgh, Scotland, owned by the University of Edinburgh.

History 
When the University developed the George Square area in the 1960s, a large swathe of Georgian Edinburgh was demolished, leading to accusations of cultural vandalism. The Appleton Tower was intended as the first phase of the proposed interlinked Fundamental Science buildings, in a development that would have covered much of the South Side. The Tower was named in posthumous honour of physicist Sir Edward Appleton, the Principal who oversaw the development from vision into concrete reality of the George Square redevelopment.

In the post-war period, vociferous support for the George Square scheme, and impassioned opposition to it, were so intense as to elevate it to a national debate.

Design 
Designed by Alan Reiach, Eric Hall and Partners, the building included seven floors of laboratory accommodation, surmounting a double-height circulation concourse, with facilities included in its podium. A block containing five lecture theatres clad in conglomerate concrete and pebble-imbedded slabs is attached to its southern side. The tower's completion in 1966 created a symbolic manifestation of Appleton's vision for integration of the arts and sciences, with the twin towers of David Hume (Arts, now called 40 George Square) and Appleton (Sciences), dominating the University's Central area.

An associated teaching block for east George Square, and a Mathematics and Physics building for the "car park site" on north Crichton Street, were intended to interlock at this sector. The latter project was relocated to King's Buildings in the 1960s, resulting in the James Clerk Maxwell Building; the succeeding project for the site, the Dental Hospital and School, was abandoned for lack of funding. The Tower was left isolated - and without a proper entrance, as this had been intended to be via connection to further construction.

Appleton Tower was built to allow first-year science students to be taught in the university's Central area. It has five lecture theatres, together accommodating around 1,200 students, and several smaller seminar and tutorial rooms. The upper floors originally housed teaching laboratories, which, with the development of more modern facilities at King's Buildings, had become outdated by the end of the 20th century. The upper floors are now used primarily by the school of informatics for free access study space, office space, and small teaching rooms.

Refurbishment in 2006 
Three floors (3-5) of the building have been used by the School of Informatics since the Edinburgh Cowgate fire in December 2002. These have been completely refurbished, creating a modern environment for teaching and research, although research has all but completely moved to the Informatics Forum. The five lecture theatres and teaching space on the ground and first floors were refurbished in 2006, and the remaining floors (basement and 6-8) were renovated in 2007.

Recladding 
The Tower's external cladding of pre-cast concrete slabs with mosaic detailing had suffered badly from the Scottish weather, and in 2014 the university received permission for the recladding of the exterior, a reworking of the podium including the creation of a proper entrance, and integrating the Tower with the surrounding environment of Edinburgh's Southside. The refurbishment was completed on 7 November 2017.

Context 
Although the Fundamental Science Buildings were not completed, preparatory demolition of Bristo Street to form the adjoining Crichton Street site left the University with an embarrassing gap site, which remained as an open, windswept car park for over forty years.

The 2007 completion of the interior renovation of Appleton Tower coincides with further development of the surrounding area; the Crichton Street Car Park closed in 2005 to allow construction of the Informatics Forum, which was completed in 2008.

Criticism

Outwards appearance 

Geneticist Steve Jones has nominated "the ugliness of the Appleton Tower" as one of the wonders of the world for a BBC2 TV show.

Early in 2005, a student newspaper launched a campaign to nominate it for the Channel 4 series Demolition – a series about the "worst buildings in Britain". The Tower did not make the final twelve. Later, in the same year, Historic Scotland considered giving the building listed status, but after opposition it was removed from the list.

Edinburgh Fringe
During the Edinburgh Festival Fringe each August, the building is used by the Edinburgh Festival Fringe Society as a hub for performers and press, and goes by the name of Fringe Central. The venue is designated as Venue 2 of the Fringe.

References

External links

 Edinburgh University CompSoc – Appleton Tower
 Photo from the BBC
 blitzandblight.com / Appleton Tower

Buildings and structures of the University of Edinburgh